Mekhora (lit. Homeland) was a short-lived one-man political faction in Israel in the late 1990s.

Background
The faction was formed on 4 March 1999, during the 14th Knesset, when MK Moshe Peled, a Deputy Speaker of the Knesset and Deputy Minister of Education, Culture and Sport, left Tzomet. The faction immediately merged into Moledet.

Peled lost his seat in the 1999 elections, in which Moledet ran as part of the National Union.

External links
Mekhora Knesset website

Political parties established in 1999
Political parties disestablished in 1999
Defunct political parties in Israel
1999 establishments in Israel